The Commonwealth of Independent States (or CIS) is a regional organisation formed of former Soviet states that competed at the Hopman Cup in 1992. It reached the quarterfinal stage of the tournament.

Since 1992, four of the independent states which form the CIS have competed in the Hopman Cup individually. These are: Kazakhstan, Russia, Ukraine and Uzbekistan. Prior to 1992, they all competed as the Soviet Union.

Players
This is a list of players who have played for the CIS in the Hopman Cup.

Results

References

See also
Kazakhstan at the Hopman Cup
Russia at the Hopman Cup
Soviet Union at the Hopman Cup
Ukraine at the Hopman Cup
Uzbekistan at the Hopman Cup

Hopman Cup teams